Shanbeh ( Šanbe; Tajik: Шанбе Šanbe) is the name of the first day of the week in the Persian language and the Solar Hijri calendar, mainly used in Iran and Afghanistan. The week names are also used in Tajik, a Cyrillic based standard of Persian, though Tajikistan does not use the Solar Hijri Calendar. It is equivalent to Sabbath or Saturday of the Gregorian Calendar.

The name of the other days of the week are  Yekšanbe (Sunday);  Došanbe (Monday);  Sešanbe (Tuesday);  Čahâršanbe (Wednesday);  Panjšanbe (Thursday);  Jom'e (Friday), which is an Arabic word, the Persian equivalent being  Âdine.

The modern Turkish names of Wednesday and Thursday, çarşamba and perşembe, are derived from the shanbeh system.
Iranian calendar